McKinley Technology High School is a public citywide 9th–12th grade high school in the District of Columbia Public Schools in Northeast Washington, D.C.  The school, an offshoot of Central High School (now Cardozo Senior High School), originally was called McKinley Technical High School and was located at 7th Street NW and Rhode Island Avenue NW in the District of Columbia.  The United States Congress allocated $26 million in 1926 for the construction of the existing building at 2nd and T Streets NE, in the Eckington area.  The school is named for William McKinley, the 25th President of the United States.

Academics 
McKinley Tech is a STEM-focused DCPS application high school. Students focus on one of three courses of study: Engineering, Information Technology (Networking, Computer Science, and Digital Media), or Biotechnology.

History 

The school was exclusively for white residents of the City of Washington until integrated with other DC schools by an Executive Order by President Dwight D. Eisenhower in June 1954.  The school underwent a rapid change in the ethnic groups attending the school, similar to other schools in Washington, DC, and was a majority African-American school by 1960.  The school continued to offer programs in printing, automotive technology, and other technical fields.

Between 1929 and 1940 and again in 1942-1943 the school's gymnasium, Tech Gymnasium, served as a home court for the Georgetown Hoyas basketball team.

Enrollment fell from a peak of 2400 in the late 1960s to approximately 500 in the mid-1990s.  The school was selected for closure during the period of the congressionally authorized financial control board. The school was shuttered in June 1997.

During the mayoral election campaign of 1998, then Chief Financial Officer Anthony A. Williams promised the city a technology-focused high school to connect city youth with the growing technology base of the Washington-area economy.  After assuming the position of Mayor in January 1999, planning began on a school that did not have a decided location.  In 2000 a decision was made to place the new school in the closed McKinley facility.  Plans at that time included placing incubator companies in the facility and using the facility for professional development for the DC Public Schools and for the growing charter schools movement.  In July 2001, the school's opening was delayed from 2002 to 2003.  In January 2002, Daniel Gohl assumed the role of Founding Principal, coming from the Science Academy of Austin in Austin, Texas.  In October 2002 the DC School Board delayed the opening again to September 2004.  Renovations to the older campus and modernization in a manner consistent with its intended role as a technology school were cited as reasons for the delay. The school finally reopened on September 1, 2004, for grades 9 and 10.  On August 28, 2006, the school had a complete program for grades 9-12 and an enrollment of 800 students.

David Pinder was appointed principal in 2007.

On September 7, 2012 Secretary of Education, Arne Duncan named McKinley a National Blue Ribbon School. David Pinder was awarded DCPS Principal of the Year, 2012.

Athletics
The McKinley Tech Trainers compete in the DCIAA. They offer baseball, bowling, boys' basketball (JV and varsity), boys' soccer, cheerleading, cross country, flag football, football, girls' basketball, girls' soccer, indoor track, softball, swimming, tennis, track, and volleyball.

Notable alumni
 Tim Bassett, forward, New York Nets
 John Battle, former professional NBA player (Cleveland Cavaliers)
 Charlie Brotman, Presidential inauguration announcer, longtime Redskins P.A. announcer, and publicist for Sugar Ray Leonard
 David Carliner, immigration and civil rights lawyer
 Francine Haskins, multi-media textile artist and book illustrator
 Dennis F. Hightower, Former Deputy Secretary, US Department of Commerce; former President, Walt Disney Television & Telecommunications
 Tony Jannus, early aviator.
 Gene Littles, All-American guard, High Point College basketball, ABA Carolina Cougars, NBA coach
 Bill Martin, former professional NBA player (Indiana Pacers)
 John Mauchly, inventor ENIAC computer (first large supercomputer)
 Michael Morgan, conductor
 Lonnie Perrin, fullback, Denver Broncos
 Joseph Paul Reason, Admiral, US Navy (Retd). First African American Four-star Admiral
 Joe Rosenthal, U.S. Marine, photographer
 Richard Smallwood, gospel artist, director, Richard Smallwood Singers
 Jean Edward Smith, author
 Emmet G. Sullivan, judge
 Edward Thiele, U.S. Coast Guard Rear Admiral
 Orlando Vega, forward, Puerto Rican Olympic and national basketball teams
 Red Webb, former Major League Baseball player (New York Giants)
 Gig Young, Academy Award for Best Supporting Actor for his performance in the film They Shoot Horses, Don't They?
 William Seifriz, University of Pennsylvania professor

References

External links

 

Public high schools in Washington, D.C.
Magnet schools in Washington, D.C.
District of Columbia Public Schools
Georgetown Hoyas basketball venues
Schools in Washington, D.C.
African-American history of Washington, D.C.
1926 establishments in Washington, D.C.
Educational institutions established in 1926